The World at War is a 26-episode British documentary television series that chronicles the events of the Second World War. It was produced in 1973, at a cost of £900,000, the most expensive factual series ever produced. It was produced by Jeremy Isaacs, narrated by Laurence Olivier and included music composed by Carl Davis. The book, The World at War, published the same year, was written by Mark Arnold-Forster to accompany the TV series.

The World at War attracted widespread acclaim and now it is regarded as a landmark in British television history. The series focused on a portrayal of the experience of the conflict: of how life and death throughout the war years affected soldiers, sailors and airmen, civilians, concentration camp inmates and other victims of the war.

Overview 
Jeremy Isaacs had been inspired to look at the production of a long-form documentary series about the Second World War following the BBC's broadcast of its series The Great War in 1964. However, the BBC series, which had been produced in collaboration with the Imperial War Museum, featured a mix of contemporary film footage from the period, and film recreations, which soured relations between the BBC and the Museum. As a consequence, Isaacs was determined to have his programme be as authentic as possible.

The World at War was commissioned by Thames Television in 1969. The government had halved its levy on television advertising revenue, with the proviso that the money which the independent television companies saved must be reinvested in programmes. Isaacs persuaded Thames to use the money to pay for the production of his Second World War documentary. The series took four years to produce, at a cost of £900,000, a record for a British television series. It was first shown in 1973 on ITV.

The series featured interviews with major members of the Allied and Axis campaigns, including witness accounts from civilians, enlisted men, officers and politicians. The interviewees included Sir Max Aitken, Joseph Lawton Collins, Mark Clark, Jock Colville, Karl Dönitz, James "Jimmy" Doolittle, Lawrence Durrell, Lord Eden of Avon, Mitsuo Fuchida, Adolf Galland, Minoru Genda, W. Averell Harriman, Sir Arthur Harris, Alger Hiss, Brian Horrocks, Traudl Junge, Toshikazu Kase, Curtis LeMay, Vera Lynn, Hasso von Manteuffel, Bill Mauldin, John J. McCloy, Lord Mountbatten of Burma, Sir Richard O'Connor, J. B. Priestley, Saburo Sakai, Albert Speer, James Stewart, Charles Sweeney, Paul Tibbets, Walter Warlimont, Takeo Yoshikawa and the historian Stephen Ambrose.

In the programme The Making of "The World at War", included in the DVD set, Jeremy Isaacs explains that priority was given to interviews with surviving aides and assistants rather than recognised figures. The most difficult person to locate and persuade to be interviewed was Heinrich Himmler's adjutant Karl Wolff. During the interview, he admitted to witnessing a mass execution in Himmler's presence. Isaacs later expressed satisfaction with the content of the series, noting that if it had not been secret, he would have added references to British codebreaking at Bletchley Park. In a list of the 100 Greatest British Television Programmes which was compiled by the British Film Institute during 2000, voted for by industry professionals, The World at War ranked 19th, the highest-placed documentary on the list.

Episodes 
The series has twenty-six episodes. Isaacs asked Noble Frankland, director of the Imperial War Museum, to list fifteen main campaigns of the war and devoted one episode to each. The remaining eleven episodes are devoted to other matters, such as the rise of Nazi Germany, home life in Britain and Germany, the experience of occupation of the Netherlands, and the Holocaust. Episode one begins with a cold open describing the massacre at the French village of Oradour-sur-Glane by the Waffen SS. The same event is referenced again at the end of Episode twenty-six, accompanied by the "Dona nobis pacem" (Latin for "Grant us peace") from the Missa Sancti Nicolai, composed by Joseph Haydn. The series ends with Laurence Olivier saying "Remember".

Broadcast history 
The series was originally transmitted on the ITV network in Britain between 31 October 1973 and 8 May 1974, and has been shown around the world. It was first shown in the US in syndication on various stations in 1974. WOR in New York aired the series in the mid-1970s, although episodes were edited both for graphic content and to include sufficient commercial breaks. PBS station WNET in New York broadcast the series unedited and in its entirety in 1982 as did WGBH in the late 1980s. The Danish channel DR1 first broadcast the series from August 1976 to February 1977 and it was repeated on DR2 in December 2006 and January 2007. The History Channel in Japan began screening the series in its entirety in April 2007. It repeated the entire series again in August 2011. The Military History Channel in the UK broadcast the series over the weekend of 14 and 15 November 2009. The Military Channel (now American Heroes Channel) in the United States aired the series in January 2010, and has shown it regularly since. BBC Two in the UK transmitted a repeat run of the series starting on 5 September 1994 at teatime. In 2011, the British channel Yesterday started a showing of the series and it has been shown continuously since. The series was shown in full on SABC in South Africa in 1976, one of the first documentary series broadcast after the launch of the first television service in South Africa in January 1976.

The series was shown in Australia in 1975 and has been shown on various TV stations at various times since then. It has also been shown on Australia's Pay TV Provider Foxtel in the early 2000s and a number of times since.

Each episode was 52 minutes excluding commercials; as was customary for ITV documentary series at the time, it was originally screened with only one central break. The episode "Genocide (1941–1945)" was screened uninterrupted.

Additional episodes 
Some footage and interviews that were not used in the original series were later made into hour and half-hour documentaries, narrated by Eric Porter. These were released as a bonus to the VHS version and are included in the DVD set of the series, which was first released in 2001.

 Secretary of Hitler (Disc 15-
 From War to Peace (Disc 15-2)
 Warrior (Disc 16)
 Hitler's Germany The People’s Community (Disc 17)
 Hitler's Germany Total War (Disc 18-1)
 The Two Deaths of Adolf Hitler (Disc 18-2)
 The final solution Part One (Disc 19)
 The final solution Part Two (Disc 20)
 The Making of the Series: The World at War
 Making of the Series - A 30th Anniversary Retrospective
 Experiences of war
 Restoring the World at War

Home media history 
The series was released in various territories on VHS video as well as on 13 Laservision long-play videodiscs by Video Garant Amsterdam.

In 2001–2005, DVD box sets were released in the UK and US. In 2010, the series was digitally restored and re-released on DVD and Blu-ray. In the latter case the image is cropped from its original 1.33:1 aspect ratio down to 1.78:1, to better fit modern widescreen televisions. The restored series was re-released on DVD and Blu-ray in its original aspect ratio in the United Kingdom on 31 October 2016.

From 2004 to 2005, A&E Home Entertainment, under licence from Thames, talkbackTHAMES and FremantleMedia International released all 26 episodes of the series on Region 1 DVD, uncut, uncensored and remastered. 

Episode 1. Secretary of Hitler (Disc 15–1)
Episode 2. From War to Peace (Disc 15–2)
Episode 3. Warrior (Disc 16)
Episode 4. Hitler's Germany The People's Community (Disc 17)
Episode 5. Hitler's Germany Total War (Disc 18–1)
Episode 6. The Two Deaths of Adolf Hitler (Disc 18–2)
Episode 7. The Final Solution Part One (Disc 19)
Episode 8. The Final Solution Part Two (Disc 20)
Episode 9. The Making of the Series: The World at War
Episode 10. Making of the Series - A 30th Anniversary Retrospective
Episode 11. Experiences of war
Episode 12. Restoring the World at War

Books 
The original book The World at War, which accompanied the series, was written by Mark Arnold-Forster in 1973. In October 2007, Ebury Press published The World at War, a new book by Richard Holmes, an oral history of the Second World War drawn from the interviews conducted for the TV series. The programme's producers shot hundreds of hours of interviews, but only a fraction of that recorded material was used for the final version of the series. A selection of the rest of this material was published in this book, which included interviews with Albert Speer, Karl Wolff (Himmler's adjutant), Traudl Junge (Hitler's secretary), James Stewart (USAAF bomber pilot and Hollywood star), Anthony Eden, John Colville (Private Secretary to Winston Churchill), Averell Harriman (US Ambassador to the Soviet Union) and Arthur "Bomber" Harris (Head of RAF Bomber Command).

See also 
 All Our Yesterdays – a Granada TV series covering some of this period.
 Apocalypse: The Second World War (2009) – an RTBF documentary on the Second World War
 BBC History of World War II (1989–2005)
 Cold War (1998) CNN TV production also produced by Jeremy Isaacs
 The Great War (1964) – BBC TV production
 The Secret War (1977) – a BBC TV series on the technological advances of the Second World War
 The Unknown War (1978) – an American documentary television series, produced with Soviet cooperation after the release of The World at War, which the Soviet government felt had paid insufficient attention to their part in World War II, the series was narrated by Burt Lancaster
 World War One (1964) – a Production of CBS

References

External links 
 Complete series at archive.org https://archive.org/details/the-world-at-war-1973
 
 
 
 

 
1973 British television series debuts
1974 British television series endings
1970s British documentary television series
British military television series
Documentary television series about aviation
Documentary television series about World War II
English-language television shows
ITV documentaries
Television shows produced by Thames Television
Television series by Fremantle (company)
Japan in non-Japanese culture
Anthony Eden